Anaphalis acutifolia is a species of flowering plants within the family Asteraceae. It is found in South Tibet (Yadong).

References

acutifolia
Flora of Tibet